Viscount Shannon, in the County of Limerick, was a title in the Peerage of Ireland. It was created in 1660 for the Honourable Francis Boyle, sixth son of Richard Boyle, 1st Earl of Cork. He was succeeded by his grandson, the second Viscount. He was a Field Marshal in the Army and served as Commander-in-Chief of Ireland from 1727 to 1740. The title became extinct on his death in 1740.

Viscounts Shannon (1660)
Francis Boyle, 1st Viscount Shannon (1623–1699)
Richard Boyle, 2nd Viscount Shannon (–1740)

See also
Earl of Cork
Earl of Shannon

Notes

References
Kidd, Charles, Williamson, David (editors). Debrett's Peerage and Baronetage (1990 edition). New York: St Martin's Press, 1990, 

Extinct viscountcies in the Peerage of Ireland
Noble titles created in 1660
Boyle family